Rhythms of Resistance, sometimes abbreviated to RoR, is a network of percussion bands that play at demonstrations and direct actions that fall within the broad definition of 'anti-capitalist'. Since RoR London was formed in 2000, similar groups have arisen around the world; while not all such bands use the Rhythms of Resistance name, they generally share the same ideology, described on the RoR website:

 We are a transnational anti-hierarchical anticapitalist, antisexist and antiracist network fighting for social and ecological justice.
 We are activists using tactical frivolity as a form of political action to confront any system of domination.
 We also directly support everybody experiencing or struggling against exploitation, discrimination and oppression, without compromising our principles.
 Our tactics include drumming and dancing inspired by samba and carnival.
 We reject any false opposition between militancy and creative forms of resistance.
 Even if we are different bands operating in a decentralized fashion, we aim to maximise participation in our collective process.
 We are an open network to any people who share our principles.
 Come with us! We have everything to play for!

The RoR bands are often referred to as the "samba bands", although many bands incorporate instruments and rhythms from outside of the samba genre.

RoR has similarities to the Afro Bloc parading drum bands that emerged in the mid 1970s in Salvador da Bahia in Brazil.  Bands such as Ilê Aiyê and Olodum formed as a political expression of black awareness, resisting economic exclusion. Coming out of some impoverished urban communities, Afro blocs became a mobilising focus on picket lines and marches.

Rhythms of Resistance formed as part of the UK Earth First action against the International Monetary Fund/World Bank meeting in Prague in September 2000. A Pink and Silver carnival bloc, focused around a fifty-five piece band, detached itself from a march of 67,000 and outmaneuvered police resources defending the IMF annual summit. The protests also included a black bloc and a group from the Italian Ya Basta movement, and led to the shutting down of the summit.

Following this event, similar groups formed elsewhere making use of the same tactics. The Amsterdam band formed in for the Rising Tide Actions against the Cop6 Climate Conference in November 2000 and joined together with ten drummers from Rhythms of Resistance to form a sixty-five piece band. Rhythms of Resistance groups can now be found across Europe and in North America.

References

External links 
 Website of the network Rhythms of Resistance
 Player for the tunes

Musical advocacy groups
Organizations established in 2000
Anti-globalization organizations